1513 Mátra, provisional designation , is a stony Florian asteroid from the inner regions of the asteroid belt, approximately 5 kilometers in diameter. It was discovered on 10 March 1940, by Hungarian astronomer György Kulin at Konkoly Observatory in Budapest, Hungary. It was later named after the Mátra mountain range.

Orbit and classification 

Mátra is a member of the Flora family, a large group of stony S-type asteroids in the inner main-belt. It orbits the Sun at a distance of 2.0–2.4 AU once every 3 years and 3 months (1,186 days). Its orbit has an eccentricity of 0.10 and an inclination of 4° with respect to the ecliptic.

One day prior to Mátras official discovery observation at Konkoly, a precovery was taken at Nice Observatory. However, the body's observation arc begins 10 years later in 1950, when it was observed at the La Plata Observatory in Argentina.

Physical characteristics

Rotation period 

American astronomer Richard P. Binzel obtained a rotational light-curve of Mátra from photometric observation in the 1980s. It gave a tentative rotation period of 24 hours with a brightness variation of 0.1 magnitude. As of 2017, a secure period still has yet to be determined.

Diameter and albedo 

According to the survey carried out by NASA's Wide-field Infrared Survey Explorer with its subsequent NEOWISE mission, Mátra measures between 4.96 and 6.60 kilometers in diameter and its surface has an albedo between 0.189 and 0.34.

The Collaborative Asteroid Lightcurve Link assumes an albedo of 0.24 – derived from the family's largest body and namesake, the asteroid 8 Flora – and calculates a diameter of 5.85 kilometers with an absolute magnitude of 13.33.

Naming 

This minor planet was named after the Mátra mountain range in northern Hungary, where the outstation of the discovering Konkoly Observatory is located. The official naming citation was published by the Minor Planet Center on 1 February 1980.

References

External links 
 Asteroid Lightcurve Database (LCDB), query form (info )
 Dictionary of Minor Planet Names, Google books
 Asteroids and comets rotation curves, CdR – Observatoire de Genève, Raoul Behrend
 Discovery Circumstances: Numbered Minor Planets (1)-(5000) – Minor Planet Center
 
 

001513
Discoveries by György Kulin
Named minor planets
19400310